Pizzo Molare is a mountain of the Lepontine Alps, overlooking Faido in the Swiss canton of Ticino. It is located on the chain between the main Leventina valley and the valley of Blenio.

References

External links

 Pizzo Molare on Hikr

Mountains of the Alps
Mountains of Switzerland
Mountains of Ticino
Lepontine Alps